Hudhud was, according to the Quran, the messenger and envoy of the prophet Sulayman. It refers to the sagacious birds in Islam, also referred to in The Conference of the Birds, a Persian poem by Attar of Nishapur as the "king of birds". The bird appears twice in the 27th chapter of An-Naml. Hudhud, as described by the Quran played an important role between Sulayman and Queen of Sheba while carrying messages between the two.

The word "birds" appears thirteen times in the central religious text of the Muslims, while the word "bird" appears five times, including the Hoopoe twice, which in Islamic belief is often recognized as a creature for communication activities.

Observations 

One day when Sulayman took the roll call of the birds he discovered that the hudhud was missing.

Later when the bird arrived he described the situation before him for being away in the meeting.

I have discovered what you have not discovered, and I have arrived to you from the "Land of Sabah" where I found a wealthy woman with wonderful throne ruling over people An-Naml, Āyah (20–24)

As a pivotal role, the hoopoe also informed Sulayman that the queen, along with her associates, worshipped the sun. Sulayman subsequently wrote a letter and gave it to the bird for the queen to check the authenticity of what the bird said. The queen in return, sent gifts to him but he declined to accept them all. She later visited him, saw manifestation of Sulayman, and adopted set of beliefs identified with religious conversion of Islam.

Muslim belief and modern reception 
Since the scientific evidence limit behavior and mental processes of the birds compared to human intelligence, Hoopoes have been a subject of discussion. Some   people argue "Hudhud" was possibly a human employed for communicating messages, as a bird could not be credited with the intellectual capability of humans, concept learning and expression, which is marked by recognize patterns, solve problems, make decisions, retain information, and use language to communicate that could come to know about the queen and her government, and worship mechanism. A human, according to science is not able to understand languages of the birds with absolute certainty, the prophet, as described by the Quran was bestowed with the abilities to know what animals, including hudhud feel, see, hear, understand and think, as the bird was trained by the Prophet to collect information like humans.

A book titled When Elephants Weep by Jeffrey Moussaieff Masson and Susan McCarthy have described the animal cognition, comprising a detailed account of Dogs, Cats and Ants.

Mythological characteristics 
Huhhud, according to an uncertain Iranian legend, was originally a married woman. Her father-in-law entered the room and found her in an uncovered state when she was combing her hair. It was embarrassing to her, so she flew with the comb on her head. Thus, the bird became known in Persian language as "Şâne-ser" (scallop headed). In Islamic literature, the main features of huhhud were to collect the information and report it to Sulayman. It is also suggested that the bird was primarily involved in dowsing such as locating underground water.

It has been referred to as in Turkish literature one of the sacred birds known as "Mürg-i Süleyman". The bird, according to Turkish philosophy, is given long silk on his head for his loyalty and compassion. Some mystic traditionalists credits the Hoopoe a "meaningful succession of images" while seeing in dream.

References 

Legendary birds
Islamic legendary creatures
Quranic figures